Megalotriton is an extinct genus of prehistoric salamanders which lived in Europe during the Late Eocene.

See also 
 List of prehistoric amphibians

References 

Prehistoric amphibian genera
Cenozoic salamanders
Eocene amphibians
Paleogene amphibians of Europe
Paleogene France
Fossils of France
Quercy Phosphorites Formation
Fossil taxa described in 1890